Gregory Alexandre (born May 31, 1985) is a professional Canadian football defensive lineman who is currently a free agent. He was drafted 35th overall by the Toronto Argonauts in the 2011 CFL Draft and signed with the team on his birthday, May 31, 2011. He played college football for the Montreal Carabins.

He was released by the Argonauts on June 20, 2012. Alexander agreed to terms with the Eskimos on May 13, 2013.

References

External links
Edmonton Eskimos bio

1985 births
Living people
Canadian football defensive linemen
Edmonton Elks players
Montreal Carabins football players
Players of Canadian football from Quebec
Canadian football people from Montreal
Toronto Argonauts players